Namess Mimekh (in Hebrew נמס ממך) is the debut album of Israeli vocalist Omer Adam released in 2010. The album was released a year after Adam participated in the Israeli reality show, Kokhav Nolad, and got disqualified from the show because he was younger than 16 years old, the minimum age of participation.

Five singles were released from the album. One of them, "Neshima," a song with Esti Ginzburg made it to the top of the Israeli Singles Chart. Another song, "Kol ma SheRatziti," made it to #2 in the same charts.

Track list

Remixes (bonus)

2010 debut albums
Hebrew-language albums